Louis Boisgibault (born June 30, 1962) is a French higher education director, corporate director, professor, researcher and author known for his publications on energy transition in the EMEA Region. He works as director of development and cooperations, full-time faculty member, at North American Private University in Sfax, Tunisia.

Early life and education 
Boisgibault was born in Neuilly-sur-Seine. He graduated in 1984 with a master's degree in economics and management from Université Paris-Dauphine. He received a MBA from HEC Paris in 1990 with an exchange program at the Wharton School. In September 2016, he defended successfully a PhD thesis at Sorbonne Université in geography.

Career 
After eight years at BNP-Paribas in Paris and Amsterdam, Boisgibault worked for Electricité de France and Engie Group in Paris and London, as executive director and Board member for energy projects. In 2006, he co-founded and led VALMERE, a consulting firm specialized in energy transition. He started to lecture in graduate schools and enrolled for PhD. After several part-time positions as Senior Lecturer and contractual Professor, he was appointed in March 2022 as Director of Development and Cooperations and full-time faculty member at North American Private University in Sfax, Tunisia.

Publications

Books and book chapters 
 Energy Transition in Metropolises, Rural Areas and Deserts. With Fahad Al Kabbani and foreword by Jean Girardon. Wiley, pp.246, 2020, Energy series, 9781786304995.
 Transition énergétique dans les métropoles, la ruralité et le désert. Avec Dr Fahad Al Kabbani et préface de Prof. Dr. Jean Girardon. ISTE editions, pp.236, 2019, collection énergie, 9781784056025.
 L'énergie solaire après Fukushima, la nouvelle. With foreword by Prof. Dr. Patrice Geoffron. Medicilline, pp.154, 2011, Clés de l'énergie, 9782915220377.
 Energies. Géographie des mers et des océans, Sous la direction de Prof. Dr. Raymond Woessner. Atlande, 2014, 9782350302751.
 Carbon Constraint in the Mediterranean: Differentiated Impacts and Policies for Carbon Reduction in the Euro-Mediterranean Region, Report IPEMED, with Morgan Mozas, 54p, September 2012
 Etre executive director à Londres. Avec HEC Alumni. Témoignage dans le livre collectif : 100+ témoignages sur la gouvernance d'entreprise. Plus de 100 diplômés HEC de tous horizons partagent leur expérience des conseils d'administration., Les Ozalids d'Humensis, 2020, 978-2380210101.

Conference papers 
 Changement climatique en Afrique subsaharienne, de la vulnérabilité à l'adaptation. Avec Prof. Dr. Pauline Dibi-Anoh. Douzièmes Journées Géographiques de Côte d'Ivoire (JGCI - 2020), Association des géographes de Côte d'Ivoire (AGCI), Feb 2020, Grand-Bassam, Côte d'Ivoire.
 Les énergies renouvelables, l’expérience du Pays de Fayence. Fête de la Science, Ministère de l’Enseignement supérieur, de la Recherche et de l’Innovation, Oct 2018, Saint-Raphaël, France.
 How could the EU benefit from the COP 21 agreement?. Avec Prof. Dr. Catalin N. Lungu. International conference on energy performance of buildings, Faculty for building services engineering (FII - UTCB), Jun 2016, Bucarest, Romania. pp.3.
 Vision prospective de la transition énergétique dans les territoires. Réussir la transition énergétique, quelles dynamiques de changement., UFR Géographie et aménagement Lille, Jan 2015, UFR Géographie et aménagement Lille, France. pp.610.
 COP21 objectives: towards a joint energy transition in the Mediterranean ?. COP21, IPEMED, Nov 2015, Le Bourget, France.
 Au-delà des discours et des intentions, comment dynamiser le cadre réglementaire et institutionnel pour développer les énergies renouvelables dans l’UEMOA ? : Le Maroc peut-il servir d’exemple à l’UEMOA pour la bonne territorialisation de l’énergie solaire ?. Africa Power Forum 2014, I Conferences, Jun 2014, Dakar, Sénégal.
 La croissance verte, quels défis pour les pays de l'UEMOA ?. Forum du quarantenaire, BOAD, Nov 2013, Lomé, Togo. p9. 
 Poster, Industrialisation of village in Southern France by solar energy: How energy transition can dynamize a territory?. Annual Research Conference - 2014 (ARC'14), Nov 2014, Doha, United Arab Emirates. Qatar Foundation, Energy & Environment (EEPP0277), pp.Ref. 10.5339/qfarc.2014, 2014, Proceedings volume 1.

References 

Living people
1962 births
People associated with renewable energy
Climate economists
People from Neuilly-sur-Seine
Paris Dauphine University alumni
HEC Paris alumni
Paris-Sorbonne University alumni
BNP Paribas people
Électricité de France people
People from Sfax
French emigrants to Tunisia